Balatonszabadi is a village in Somogy county, Hungary.

East of Balatonszabadi, there is a mediumwave broadcasting facility with a 145 metres tall guyed mast radiator used for Magyar Katolikus Rádió on 1341 kHz with 150 kW. The mast carries an FM-broadcasting antenna at a height of 56 metres.

The settlement is part of the Balatonboglár wine region.

Geography
Balatonszabadi lies on the shores of Sió in the northeastern part of Somogy County, 6 km far from Siófok, the seat of Siófok District. It can be reached by turning to the south in Aranypart (part of Siófok) on the other side of M7 Motorway. The village is part of the Balatonboglár Wine Region.

Demographics
The majority of the population of Balatonszabadi is Hungarian (87.1%). Significant minorities are Germans (1.5%) and Gypsies (1.4%). The population is Catholic (Roman Catholic (54.7%) and Greek Catholic (0.2%)). There is also a remarkable Calvinist (11.6%) and Lutheran (1.5%) minority. 9.5% of the population belongs to no churches.

Main sights
The village is home to the first public statue of Lajos Kossuth in Hungary. The first sculpture was made by Béla Gerenday and was erected on June 26, 1894 on the Kossuth square, the main square of the village. But in the World War II it got seriously damaged, therefore on the centenary of the Hungarian Revolution of 1848, in 1948 a new monument of Lajos Kossuth was erected which is a replica of the original one.

Notable residents
 Imre Veszprémi (1932 - 2013), Hungarian sculptor
 Kálmán Csukás (1901 – 1943), Hungarian lieutenant colonel
 János Szikszay (1803 – 1849), Hungarian Reformed pastor, martyr of the Hungarian Revolution of 1848

External links 
 Street map (Hungarian)

References 

Populated places in Somogy County